From 2003 to 2009, the Executive Council of Manitoba included a minister responsible for Healthy Living.  The position was created as a subset of the Ministry of Health, and was not a full cabinet portfolio.

The Minister of Healthy Living, Youth and Seniors existed from November 18, 2009 to January 13, 2012. The Minister of Healthy Living, Seniors and Consumer Affairs existed from January 13, 2012 to  October 18, 2013, when the portfolio was redistributed between the Minister of Health and the Department of Tourism, Culture, Sport and Consumer Protection.

In October 2013, a Minister of Healthy Living and Seniors, not a full cabinet portfolio, was established as a subset within the Department of Health.

Following the 2016 election, premier Brian Pallister merged the Healthy Living and Seniors portfolio with Health, established the office of Health, Seniors and Active Living.

List of ministers responsible for Healthy Child Manitoba

List of Ministers of Healthy Living, Seniors and Consumer Affairs

List of Ministers of Healthy Living and Seniors

References

External links
 Government of Manitoba - Minister of Healthy Living and Seniors

Healthy Living, Minister responsible for